Godfrey Township may refer to the following townships in the United States:

 Godfrey Township, Madison County, Illinois
 Godfrey Township, Polk County, Minnesota